Irina-Camelia Begu won the title, defeating Réka Luca Jani in the final, 6–3, 6–3.

This was the first edition of the tournament.

Seeds

Draw

Finals

Top half

Bottom half

Qualifying

Seeds

Qualifiers

Lucky losers

Draw

First qualifier

Second qualifier

Third qualifier

Fourth qualifier

References

External Links
Main Draw
Qualifying Draw

Țiriac Foundation Trophy - Singles